Vrisa is a village in the southern part of Lesbos island approximately 50 km from Mytilene. The village is named after one of the two girls Agamemnon took from Lesbos during the ten-year Trojan War. Five kilometers south is the famous Vatera beach.
On June 12, 2017 Vrissa was severely damaged in an earthquake that struck approximately 12 km South of the town of Plomari. Most people could not return to their homes, rendering the village effectively a "ghost village".

See also
List of settlements in Lesbos

Populated places in Lesbos